Avoidance may refer to:

 Avoidance coping, a kind of coping that is generally considered maladaptive, as it promotes an exaggerated fear response through negative reinforcement  
 Avoidant personality disorder, a personality disorder recognized in the Diagnostic and Statistical Manual of Mental Disorders
 Conflict avoidance, a controversial method of dealing with conflict
 Experiential avoidance, attempts to avoid thoughts, feelings, memories, physical sensations, and other internal experiences
 Australian Aboriginal avoidance practices, relationships in traditional Aboriginal society where certain people were required to avoid others in their family or clan
 Avoidance (novel), a 2002 novel by Michael Lowenthal
 Avoidance play, a card play technique in contract bridge designed to prevent a particular defender from winning the trick

See also
 
 
 Avoid (disambiguation)